Zolochiv may refer to the following places in Ukraine:

 Zolochiv, Lviv Oblast, city in Lviv Oblast
 Zolochiv, Kharkiv Oblast, urban-type settlement in Ukraine